Techtronic Industries Company Limited (TTI Group or TTI) is a Hong Kong-based, multinational company that designs, produces, and markets power tools; outdoor power equipment; hand tools, and floor care appliances. It pioneered cordless power tools powered by lithium-ion rechargeable batteries.

TTI manufactures in China, Vietnam, the U.S., Mexico and Europe, and in 2021, had annual sales of US$13.2 billion.

History
In 1985, TTI was founded by Horst Julius Pudwill and Roy Chi Ping Chung as an original equipment manufacturer for overseas brands. In 1987, it began to produce Craftsman cordless power tools for Sears followed by cordless, handheld vacuum cleaners for Bissell.

In 1990, TTI listed on the Hong Kong Stock Exchange under stock code 0669 by initial public offering. Its ADRs also trade on Nasdaq 
as TTNDY. In 2019, the company's shares became one of the 50 constituents of the Hang Seng Index.

Techtronic purchased Milwaukee Electric Tool from Atlas Copco in 2005 and began integrating lithium-ion batteries into their lineup.

TTI's revenue grew from  US$ million in 1990 to $ million in 2001. From 2010 to 2019, its sales rose at a compounded annual growth rate of 10 percent.

Brands
TTI's brands include:

Awards

 Forbes World’s Best 200 Small Companies, 2002

 Hong Kong Awards for Industries Consumer Product Design, 2008 and 2012

 Euromoney Best Managed Company in Asia - Consumer Goods, 2014

 The Home Depot Environmental Partner of the Year and Interconnected Partner of the Year, 2020

References

Companies listed on the Hong Kong Stock Exchange
Engineering companies of Hong Kong
Electronics companies of Hong Kong
Manufacturing companies established in 1985
Electronics companies established in 1985
1985 establishments in Hong Kong
Power tool manufacturers
Conglomerate companies of Hong Kong
Hong Kong brands